The 24th New Zealand Parliament was a term of the New Zealand Parliament. It opened on 23 February 1932, following the 1931 election. It was dissolved on 1 November 1935 in preparation for the 1935 election. The 24th Parliament was extended by one year because the 1935 election was held later than anticipated due to the ongoing depression, similarly the 1919, and the 1943 elections were held two years late, having been postponed during World War I and World War II respectively.

The Prime Minister during the 24th Parliament was George Forbes, leader of the United Party. Many commentators at the time, however, alleged that Gordon Coates, leader of the larger Reform Party, had the greater influence.

The 24th Parliament consisted of eighty representatives, each elected from separate geographical electorates.

Ministries
The 24th Parliament was led by a coalition of the Reform Party and the United Party; Reform had twenty-eight seats, United had nineteen, and there were four pro-coalition independents.  The primary opposition was from the Labour Party, which had twenty-four seats. The small Country Party had one seat, and there were four non-aligned independents. The distribution of seats between three large parties (also a feature of the previous parliament) was relatively unusual, as New Zealand tended towards a two-party system at the time.

The coalition government had been formed on 22 September 1931 during the term of the previous Parliament. During the difficult times of the Great Depression, Forbes had wanted to form a grand coalition with the Labour Party and the Reform Party.  Labour refused, but Reform went into a coalition government with United from September 1931.

Party standings

Start of Parliament

End of Parliament

Electoral boundaries

Members

Initial MPs

By-elections during 24th Parliament
There were a number of changes during the term of the 24th Parliament.

Summary of changes
Tuiti Makitanara, the United MP for Southern Maori, died on 26 June 1932. The resulting 1932 by-election was won by Eruera Tirikatene, an independent candidate associated with the Rātana religious movement.
George Black, the independent MP for Motueka, died on 7 October 1932. The resulting 1932 by-election was won by Keith Holyoake of the Reform Party.
James McCombs, the Labour MP for Lyttelton, died on 2 August 1933. The resulting 1933 by-election Labour victory by his wife, Elizabeth McCombs, made her the first woman to win election to the New Zealand Parliament.
Harry Holland, leader of the Labour Party and MP for Buller, died on 8 October 1933. The resulting 1933 by-election was won by Paddy Webb, also of the Labour Party.
Elizabeth McCombs died on 7 June 1935, twenty-two months after her husband's death, and the resulting 1935 by-election returned her son, Terry McCombs.

Notes

References

New Zealand parliaments